Paul Quattlebaum House is a historic home in Conway, Horry County, South Carolina, It was built about 1890 and is a 1½-story, gambrel-roofed, single-clad frame residence. It was remodeled in 1911 in the Dutch Colonial Revival style by Paul Quattlebaum to take its present form.

It was listed on the National Register of Historic Places in 1986.

References

External links
Quattlebaum, Paul, House - Conway, South Carolina - U.S. National Register of Historic Places on Waymarking.com

Houses on the National Register of Historic Places in South Carolina
Colonial Revival architecture in South Carolina
Houses in Horry County, South Carolina
Dutch Colonial Revival architecture in the United States
Houses completed in 1890
National Register of Historic Places in Horry County, South Carolina
Buildings and structures in Conway, South Carolina